Hijabs in Iran have been a subject of controversy. A hijab is a traditional head covering worn by Muslim women for modesty. In the 1920s, a few women appeared unveiled despite the norm of traditional custom. In the 1930s, women were encouraged not to veil. In 1936, veils were temporarily banned. In 1941, this ban was lifted. However, it was still considered "backward." This view changed to being pro-veiling after the 1979 Iranian Revolution. Since 1981, all women must wear loose-fitting clothing and a headscarf in public.

Background
During the Middle Ages, Turkic nomadic tribes from Central Asia arrived, whose women did not wear headscarves. However, after the Safavid centralization in the 16th century, the headscarf became defined as the standard headdress for many religious women in urban areas all around the Iranian Empire. Exceptions to this were seen only in the villages and among nomadic tribes, such as Qashqai. Covering the whole face was rare among the Iranians and was mostly restricted to local Arabs and local Afghans. Later, during the economic crisis in the late 19th century under the Qajar dynasty, the poorest religious urban women could not afford headscarves.

Pahlavi period

Reza Shah 
In the 1920s, a few individual Iranian women appeared unveiled despite the cultural pressure to veil. In 1924, the singer Qamar-ol-Moluk Vaziri broke gender segregation and seclusion by performing unveiled in the gender-mixed company at the Grand Hotel in Tehran, and the Royal Palace Theater. 
Iranian women's rights activists supported the unveiling, and the feminist Sediqeh Dowlatabadi is believed to have been the first woman in Iran to have appeared in public without the veil in 1928.
In 1928, the Queen of Afghanistan, Soraya Tarzi, appeared unveiled publicly with the Shah during her official visit to Iran. The clergy protested and asked the Shah to tell the foreign queen to cover up, but he refused. His refusal caused rumors that the Shah planned to abolish the veil in Iran. 
In 1928, Shah's wife, queen (Tadj ol-Molouk) attended the Fatima Masumeh Shrine during her pilgrimage in Qom wearing a veil that did not cover her completely, as well as showing her face, for which a cleric harshly criticized her. As a response, Reza Shah publicly beat the cleric who had criticised the queen the next day.

It was the policy of the Shah to increase women's participation in society as a method of the modernization of the country, by the example of Turkey. The unveiling of women had a huge symbolic importance to achieve women's emancipation and participation in society, and the shah introduced the reform gradually so as not to cause unrest.

Female teachers were encouraged to unveil in 1933, and schoolgirls and women students in 1935. In 1935, the women's committee Kanun-e Banuvan (Ladies Society) was formed with support by the government in which women's rights activists campaigned for unveiling. The reform to allow female teachers and students not to veil, as well as allowing female students to study alongside men, were all reforms opposed and criticized by the Shia clergy.

Kashf-e hijab 

On 8 January 1936, Reza Shah issued a decree, Kashf-e hijab, banning all veils. The official declaration of unveiling were made on 8 January 1936, and the queen and her daughters were given an important role in this event. That day, Reza Shah attended the graduation ceremony of the Tehran Teacher's College with the queen and their two daughters unveiled and dressed in modern clothes. The queen handed out diplomas while the shah spoke about how half the population being disregarded in the past, and told women that the future was now in their hands. This was the first time an Iranian queen showed herself in public. Afterwards, the Shah published pictures of his unveiled wife and daughters, and the unveiling was enforced throughout Iran.
To enforce this decree, the police were ordered to physically remove the veil from any women who wore it publicly. Many conservative women chose not leave their houses to avoid confrontations, and a few conservative women even committed suicide to avoid removing their hijabs due to the decree.

The ban was left in place for five years, from 1936 to 1941. The Iranian women's movement had generally favored unveiling since its beginning, and many of Iran's leading feminists and women's rights activists organized in the Kanun-e Banuvan to campaign in favor of the Kashf-e hijab, among them Hajar Tarbiat, Khadijeh Afzal Vaziri and Sediqeh Dowlatabadi, Farrokhroo Parsa and Parvin E'tesami.

The religious conservatives reacted with opposition toward the reform. According to Iran's current Supreme Leader Ali Khamenei, the policy was aimed at "eradicating the tremendous power of faith" in Muslim societies that was enabled by what he termed the "decency of women", as hijab in his view prevented Muslim women from suffering from the "malicious abuse" that he regarded women in the West to be victims of, and what in his view made people preoccupied with sexual desires.

Mohammad Reza Pahlavi
Official measures were relaxed in 1941 under Reza Shah's successor, Mohammad Reza Pahlavi, and the wearing of a headscarf or chador was no longer an offense, but was still considered an indicator of backwardness or of membership of the lower class. 
When Reza Shah was deposed in 1941, there were attempts made by conservatives such as the Devotees of Islam (Fedāʾīān-e Eslām; q.v.) who demanded mandatory veiling and a ban on unveiled women, but they did not succeed. Under next ruler Mohammad Reza Pahlavi, wearing of the veil or chador was no longer an offence, and women were able to dress as they wished.

However, under his regime, the chador became a significant hindrance to climbing the social ladder, as it was considered a badge of backwardness and an indicator of being a member of the lower class. Veiled women were assumed to be from conservative religious families with limited education, while unveiled women were assumed to be from the educated and professional upper or middle class. The veil became a class marker; while the lower classes started to wear the veil again, the upper classes no longer wore the veil at all, while professional middle-class women such as teachers and nurses appeared unveiled in their work place, but sometimes veiled when they returned home to their families.

Discrimination against women wearing the headscarf or chador occurred, with public institutions discouraging their use, and some eating establishments refusing to admit women who wore them.

In the 1970s, the chador was usually a patterned or of a lighter color such as white or beige; black chadors were typically reserved for mourning and only became more acceptable everyday wear starting in the mid-1970s—however in the period before the Iranian Revolution the black chador's usage outside of the city of Qom was associated with allegiance with political Islam and was stigmatized by areas of Iranian society.

Revolution

During the revolution of the late 1970s, the hijab became a political symbol. The hijab was considered by Pahlavis as a rejection of their modernization policy and thereby of their rule. It became a symbol of opposition to the Pahlavi regime, with many middle-class working women starting to use it as such.

The revolutionary advocacy for the poor and tradition as a counterpoint to foreign influence brought the chador back to popularity among the opposition, and women from different classes wore hijab for different reasons, including to protest treatment of women as sex objects, solidarity with the conservative women who always wore them, and as a nationalist rejection of foreign influence.

Hijab was considered by conservative traditionalists as a sign of virtue, and thus unveiled women as the opposite. Unveiled women came to be seen by some of the opposition as a symbol of Western culture colonialism; as victims of Westoxification, "a super-consumer" of products of Imperialism, a propagator of "corrupt Western culture", undermining the traditionalist conception of "morals of society", and as overly dressed up "bourgeois dolls", who had lost their honor. The veil thus came to be some opposition women's way of expressing the revolutionary "demand for respect and dignity" and a solidarity with Iranian culture as opposed to culture colonialism, rather than a sign of backwardness.

Many protesters during the revolution belonged to the conservative fraction. Unlike in the past, when conservative women did not mix with men, thousands of veiled women participated in religious processions alongside men, when they also expressed their anti-Shah protests. In the eyes of the conservatives, the veil was thus now not a hindrance, but empowerment enabling access to public spheres. The conservative view on unveiled women made them vulnerable to sexual harassment and hostility from conservative male revolutionaries, while the hijab protected women from harassment because conservative men regarded them as more respectable.  Women protesters also wore the veil for protection during the demonstrations since the conservative fraction of the revolutionaries were hostile to unveiled women, and two slogans of the revolution were: "Wear a veil, or we will punch your head" and "Death to the unveiled".

Islamic Republic

After the Islamic Revolution, the Kashf-e hijab was reversed. Instead of prohibiting veils, the law now required them. 
In the aftermath of the revolution, hijab was made compulsory in stages. In 1979, Ayatollah Khomeini announced that women should observe Islamic dress code. Almost immediately after, starting from 8 March 1979 (International Women's Day), thousands of women began protesting against mandatory Hijab. The protests lasted six days, until 14 March.

Non-conservative women, who had worn the veil as a symbol of opposition during the revolution, had not expected veiling to become mandatory, and when the veil was first made mandatory in February 1979, the change was met with protests and demonstrations by liberal and leftist women, and thousands of women participated in a women's march on International Women's Day, 8 March 1979, in protest against mandatory veiling. The protests resulted in the temporary retraction of mandatory veiling. 
The demonstrations were met by government assurances that the statement was only a recommendation.

When the left and the liberals were eliminated and the conservatives secured solitary control, however, veiling was enforced on all women. This began with the 'Islamification of offices' in July 1980, when unveiled women were refused entry to government offices and public buildings, and banned from appearing unveiled at their work places under the risk of being fired.  On the streets, unveiled women were attacked by revolutionaries: two slogans of the revolution were: "Wear a veil, or we will punch your head" and "Death to the unveiled".

Hijab was subsequently made mandatory in government and public offices in 1980, in July 1981 an edict of mandatory veiling in public was introduced (including for non-Muslims and non-citizens), which was followed in 1983 by an Islamic Punishment Law, introducing a punishment of 74 lashes on unveiled women.

In 1983, the Islamic Consultative Assembly decided that women who do not cover their hair in public will be punished with 74 lashes. Since 1995, unveiled women can also be imprisoned for up to 60 days. Under Book 5, article 638, women in Iran who do not wear a hijab may be imprisoned from 10 days to two months, and/or required to pay fines from 50,000 up to 500,000 rials adjusted for inflation. The law was enforced by members of the Islamic Revolution Committees patrolling the streets, and later by the Guidance Patrols, also called the Morality Police.

According to one source, rules on wearing hijab are "tantamount" to the Islamic Republic's "raison d'etat."

White Wednesday 
In May 2017, My Stealthy Freedom, an Iranian online movement advocating for women's freedom of choice, created the White Wednesday movement, a campaign that invites men and women to wear white veils, scarves, or bracelets to show their opposition to the mandatory forced veiling code. The movement was geared toward women who proudly wear their veils, but reject the idea that all women in Iran should be subject to forced veiling. Masih Alinejad, an Iranian-born journalist and activist based in the UK and the US, created the movement to protest Iran's mandatory hijab rule. She described her 2017 movement via Facebook, saying, "This campaign is addressed to women who willingly wear the veil, but who remain opposed to the idea of imposing it on others. Many veiled women in Iran also find the compulsory imposition of the veil to be an insult. By taking videos of themselves wearing white, these women can also show their disagreement with compulsion." The campaign resulted in Iranian women posting pictures and videos of themselves wearing pieces of white clothing to social media.

Compulsory veiling 

On 27 December 2017, 31-year-old Vida Movahed, also known as "The Girl of Enghelab Street" was arrested for being unveiled in public after a video of the woman went viral on social media. The video showed Movahed silently waving her hijab, a white headscarf that she had removed from her head and placed on a stick for one hour on Enqelab Street, Tehran. At first it was assumed that her act was connected to the widespread protests taking place in Iran, but Movahed confirmed that she performed the act in support of the 2017 White Wednesday campaign. Movahed's arrest sparked outrage from social media, where many Iranians shared footage of her protest along with the hashtag "#Where_Is_She?". On 28 January 2018, Nasrin Sotoudeh, a renowned human rights lawyer, posted on Facebook that Movahed had been released. It was not until a few weeks later that Sotoudeh revealed the girl's identity. In the following weeks, multiple people re-enacted Movahed's public display of removing their hijabs and waving them in the air. On 1 February 2018, the Iranian police released a statement saying that they had arrested 29 people, mostly women, for removing their headscarves, contrary to Iranian law. One woman, Shima Babaei, was arrested after removing her headdress in front of a court as a symbol of her continued dedication to the cause.

On 23 February 2018, Iranian Police released an official statement saying that any women found protesting Iran's compulsory veiling code would be charged with "inciting corruption and prostitution," which carries a maximum sentence of 10 years in prison. Before this change, according to article 638 of the Islamic Penal Code of the Islamic Republic of Iran, "Anyone in public places and roads who openly commits a harām (sinful) act, in addition to the punishment provided for the act, shall be sentenced to two months imprisonment or up to 74 lashes; and if they commit an act that is not punishable but violates public prudency, they shall only be sentenced ten days to two months' imprisonment or up to 74 lashes. Note- Women who appear in public places and roads without wearing an Islamic hijab, shall be sentenced ten days to two months' imprisonment or a fine of five hundred to fifty thousand rials."

Following the announcement, multiple women reported being subjected to physical abuse by police following their arrests. Some have since been sentenced to multiple years in prison for their acts of defiance. In one video, a woman stands on top of a tall box, unveiled, waving her white scarf at passers by. The video then shows a man in a police uniform tackling the woman to the ground. Shortly after the video went viral, the Ministry of Interior (Iran) scolded police for using physical force against the woman. Salman Samani, a spokesman for Ministry released a statement on 25 February 2018 saying "No one has a license to act against the law even in the role of an officer dealing with crimes."

On 8 March 2018, a video of three Iranian women singing a feminist fight song in Tehran's subway went viral on. The women were singing in honor of International Women's Day and to highlight women's continued challenges caused by forced veiling and other discriminatory laws against women. In the video, in which three bare-headed Iranian women sing I am a Woman, calls upon women to join efforts to fight injustice and create "another world" of "equality". The women hold hands, display pictures of a previous women's rights protest, and ask the other women on the subway train to clap in honor of "having lived and fought all their lives against all kinds of discrimination, violence, humiliation, and insults." At the end of the video, one of the protesters is heard saying "Happy Women's Day to all of you."

That same day, the Supreme Leader of Iran, Ali Khamenei, made a speech during a gathering of religious poets in Tehran, posting a series of tweets in response to the series of peaceful hijab protests. Khamenei defended the dress code, praising Islam for keeping women "modest" and in their "defined roles" such as educators and mothers. He also lashed out at the Western world for, in his view, leading its own women astray. "The features of today's Iranian woman include modesty, chastity, eminence, protecting herself from abuse by men," Khamenei tweeted. He claimed that the most sought after characteristic of a Western woman involve is her ability to physically attract men.

Also outside of Iran, Melika Balali, an Iranian-Scottish wrestler, became the British champion in June 2022, she protested in the match against compulsory hijab by rising a sign which wrote on it "Stop forcing hijab, I have the right to be a wrestler".

The Iranian protests against compulsory hijab continued into the September 2022 Iranian protests which was triggered in response to the killing of Mahsa Amini, who was allegedly beaten to death by police due to wearing an "improper hijab".

References

Hijab
Sexism in Iran
Women's rights in Iran
Clothing controversies